Richard Gregory Tuck (January 25, 1924 – May 28, 2018) was an American political consultant, campaign strategist, advance man, and political prankster.

Background
Tuck was born in Hayden, Arizona, to Frank Joseph Tuck, a copper mining engineer, and the former (Mary) Olive Sweeney. He served in the United States Marine Corps during World War II, in a bomb disposal unit.

Pranks
Tuck first met Richard Nixon as a student at the University of California, Santa Barbara. In 1950, Tuck was working for Congresswoman Helen Gahagan Douglas, who was running for a seat in the U.S. Senate against Nixon. In a 1973 Time magazine article, Tuck stated, "There was an absent-minded professor who knew I was in politics and forgot the rest. He asked me to advance a Nixon visit." Tuck agreed and launched his first prank against Nixon. He rented a big auditorium, invited only a small number of people, and gave a long-winded speech to introduce the candidate. When Nixon came on stage, Tuck asked him to speak about the International Monetary Fund. When the speech was over, Nixon asked Tuck his name and told him, "Dick Tuck, you've made your last advance."

Tuck's most famous prank against Nixon is known as "the Chinatown Caper". During his campaign for Governor of California in 1962, Nixon visited Chinatown in Los Angeles. At the campaign stop, a backdrop of children holding "welcome" signs in English and Chinese was set up. As Nixon spoke, an elder from the community whispered that one of the signs in Chinese said, "What about the Hughes loan?" The sign was a reference to an unsecured $205,000 loan that Howard Hughes had made to Nixon's brother, Donald. Nixon grabbed a sign and, on camera, ripped it up. Later, Tuck learned, to his chagrin, that the Chinese characters actually spelled out "What about the huge loan?"

After the first Kennedy–Nixon debate in 1960, Tuck hired an elderly woman who put on a Nixon button and embraced the candidate in front of TV cameras. She said, "Don't worry, son! He beat you last night, but you'll get him next time."

Tuck is credited with waving a train out of the station while Nixon was still speaking. Tuck at times took responsibility, claiming "Nixon's up there talking and suddenly the crowd goes out like the morning tide" while at other times he denied it entirely saying that he did borrow a conductor's hat and wave to the engineer, but the train stayed put.

In 1968, Tuck utilized Republican nominee Nixon's own campaign slogan against him; he hired a heavily pregnant black woman to wander around a Nixon rally in a predominantly white area, wearing a T-shirt that read, "Nixon's the One!"

Political career
In 1966, Tuck ran for the California State Senate. He opened his campaign with a press conference at Forest Lawn Cemetery in Glendale, claiming that just because people had died doesn't mean they don't still have (voting) rights.

Hearing of Tuck's entry as a candidate, Richard Nixon sent him a congratulatory telegram, including an offer to campaign for him, despite Tuck's being a Democrat.

Dick Tuck designed his campaign billboards to read, in small print, "Dick", and in much larger lettering, "Tuck". The names were printed twice, piggy-backed one above the other. On the eve of the election he drove around the area and painted an extra line on the upper "Tuck" on the billboards. This converted the T in his name to an F so that passersby would see a profane phrase. Tuck said he thought voters would think his opponent had done this and he'd "get the sympathy vote" with this tactic. In a field of eight candidates for the Democratic nomination, Tuck finished third with 5,211 votes (almost 10%), losing to future Congressman George E. Danielson.

As the ballot totals piled against him on election night, the candidate was asked his reaction. Referring to his earlier cemetery speech, Tuck quipped, "Just wait till the dead vote comes in." When defeat became inevitable, Tuck made the now notorious statement, "The people have spoken, the bastards."

Tuck was a key adviser in Robert F. Kennedy's 1968 presidential campaign. After Kennedy was shot in Los Angeles, he rode in Kennedy's ambulance as the mortally wounded candidate was rushed to the hospital.

Tuck claimed that the Watergate break-in was an attempt to access information held by Larry O'Brien, chair of the Democratic National Committee about the Hughes-Nixon relationship.

Tuck was a campaign operative, and claimed he was never malicious in his political pranks. Richard Nixon obsessed about Tuck, however, as recorded in his presidential tapes. But Nixon also admired Tuck, comparing the dirty tricks committed by his staffer Donald Segretti unfavorably to the intelligence and wit behind some of Tuck's political pranks. After the Watergate scandal became public, H. R. Haldeman, White House Chief of Staff under Nixon, saw Tuck in the Capitol. Haldeman reportedly turned to Tuck and said, "You started all of this." Tuck replied, "Yeah, Bob, but you guys ran it into the ground."

Tuck also served briefly as political editor/adviser to the National Lampoon magazine.

Controversy
Virtually every great prank Dick Tuck claimed to have pulled or was associated with has been disputed in some way. Tuck often confessed and later denied his actions. He admitted to making up some of his pranks to author Neil Steinberg, who covered Tuck in his 1992 book If At All Possible, Involve A Cow: The Book of College Pranks.

However, Tuck is mentioned in an October 1972 Oval Office tape when Nixon, speaking to H. R. Haldeman about the Segretti disclosures, said, "Dick Tuck did that to me. Let's get out what Dick Tuck did!" Nixon went on to describe egged limousines and staged violence in San José, Costa Rica. According to a 1997 article in The Washington Post by reporter Karl Vick, Nixon was not the first to confuse Tuck's record with Tuck's legend.

White House tapes also record Nixon speaking with John Connally on October 17, 1972, saying Tuck had all of Goldwater's speeches in hand before they were spoken because, Nixon presumed, Tuck had an informant in the Goldwater campaign. Tuck denied this, but his reputation earned him the nickname "Democratic pixie of the 1964 race."

Retirement and death
In the later years of his life, Tuck lived in retirement in Tucson, Arizona. Tuck died on May 28, 2018, at an assisted living facility in Tucson. He was 94.

References

 San Francisco Chronicle May 15, 1974 – R. Carrol
 California Living Magazine, June 23, 1974 – S. Berman
 The Last Days of the Late, Great State of California, 1977 — Curt Gentry, Comstock Publishers
 If At All Possible, Involve A Cow: The Book of College Pranks, August 1, 1992 – Neil Steinberg; St. Martins Press 
 Bruce Felknor, Dirty Politics, New York; W.W. Norton & Co., 1966; pp. 144–149, 156.

External links
 museum of hoaxes
 Sniggle.net

1924 births
2018 deaths
Politicians from Tucson, Arizona
Military personnel from Arizona
California Democrats
University of California, Santa Barbara alumni
American political consultants
Richard Nixon
United States Marine Corps personnel of World War II
American performance artists